Rogerson is a surname. Notable people with the surname:

Barnaby Rogerson (born 1960), British author, television presenter, and publisher 
Barry Rogerson (born 1936), British bishop
Clark Thomas Rogerson (1918-2001), American mycologist
Craig Rogerson (born 1965), Australian diver
Cynthia Rogerson (born 1953), American writer
Dan Rogerson (born 1975), British Liberal Democrat politician, (MP for North Cornwall, UK)
George Rogerson (1896-1961), English cricketer
Iain Rogerson (1960-2017), British actor
Isabella Whiteford Rogerson (1835-1905), Irish-Canadian poet
James Johnstone Rogerson (1820-1907), Canadian businessman and philanthropist  
John Rogerson (disambiguation), several people
Logan Rogerson (born 1998), New Zealand footballer
Nicole Rogerson (born 1974), Australian director and CEO of Autism Awareness Australia
Philip Rogerson (born 1945), British businessman
Pippa Rogerson, British solicitor and academic 
Ralph Rogerson (born 1937), former Australian rules footballer
Richard Rogerson, American economist 
Robert Rogerson, American industrialist
Roger Rogerson (born 1941), Australian criminal and former police officer
Ron Rogerson (1943-1987), American football coach
Sean Rogerson (born 1977), Canadian actor and former photomodel
Sydney Rogerson (1915-1993), British army staff sergeant 
Simon Rogerson, Europe's first Professor of Computer Ethics
Tim Rogerson, American painter
Tom Rogerson, British musician
Wallace M. Rogerson, American exercise leader

See also
Rogerson, Idaho, an unincorporated community in Twin Falls County, Idaho, United States
Sir John Rogerson's Quay, a street and quay in Dublin (named after Sir John Rogerson)
Royscot Trust Ltd v Rogerson, an English contract law
Rogerson River, river in New Zealand
Rogerson's Village Historic District, a mill village in Massachusetts 
John Rogerson Montgomery House, residence in Illinois 
Rodgerson